Malta is the country with the most holidays in the European Union.  Since 2005, any holidays falling on Saturdays or Sundays do not add an extra day to the workers' leave pool.

National holidays

 31 March: Freedom Day ('Jum il-Ħelsien')
 7 June: Sette Giugno
 8 September: Victory Day ('Jum il-Vitorja')
 21 September: Independence Day ('Jum l-Indipendenza')
 13 December: Republic Day ('Jum ir-Repubblika')

Public holidays

 1 January: New Year's Day ('L-Ewwel tas-Sena')
 10 February: Feast of Saint Paul's Shipwreck in Malta ('Nawfraġju ta' San Pawl') - Saint Paul is the patron saint of Malta
 19 March: Feast of Saint Joseph ('San Ġużepp')
 Friday before Easter: Good Friday ('Il-Ġimgħa l-Kbira')
 1 May: Worker's Day ('Jum il-Ħaddiem')
 29 June: Feast of Saint Peter; Saint Paul, patron saints ('L-Imnarja')
 15 August: Feast of the Assumption of Our Lady ('Santa Marija')
 8 December: Feast of the Immaculate Conception ('Il-Kunċizzjoni')
 25 December: Christmas Day ('Il-Milied')

Traditional Feasts
The following is a list of feasts or special days celebrated in Malta. Note that, with the exception of the dates mentioned in the previous section, these feasts are not public holidays and on these days, business runs as usual across the Maltese islands. As Malta is largely Roman Catholic, most of these feasts celebrate Saints or events from the Holy Bible.

January

January is known by the Maltese as 'ix-xahar tal-bard' ('the month of the cold')
1 January: New Year's Day ('L-Ewwel tas-Sena' or 'L-Istrina')
First Sunday after 1 January: Epiphany ('Epifanija' or 'It-Tre Re')
13 January: Saint Anthony the Abbot ('San Anton Abbati') in Rabat
25 January: Conversion of Saint Paul ('Konverżjoni ta' San Pawl') in Mdina

February

February by the Maltese is known as 'ix-xahar ta' San Pawl' ('Saint Paul's month')

2 February: Candlemas ('Gandlora')
3 February: Saint Blase ('San Blas')
10 February: Saint Paul's Shipwreck ('San Pawl Nawfragu') in Valletta, Marsalforn and Munxar
14 February: Saint Valentine ('San Valentinu')

March

March by the Maltese is known as 'ix-xahar ta' San Ġużepp, tal-Lunzjata u tar-roħs' ('The month of Saint Joseph, the Annunciation and Sales')

19 March: Saint Joseph ('San Ġużepp') in Rabat
25 March: Annunciation ('Il-Lunzjata')
27 March: Jesus of Nazareth ('Ġesù Nazzarenu') in Sliema
31 March: Freedom Day ('Jum il-Ħelsien')

April

April is known by the Maltese as 'ix-xahar tan-nwhar u ta' San Girgor' ('the month of blossoms and Saint Gregory').

1 April: April Fool's Day ('Il-Ġifa')
First Wednesday after Easter Sunday: Saint Gregory ('San Girgor')
6 April: Saint Publius ('San Publju') in Floriana
23 April: Saint George ('San Ġorġ') in Qormi and Victoria
The following feasts are moveable, as they can occur either in March or in April.

Friday before Palm Sunday – Our Lady of Sorrows ('Id-Duluri')
Palm Sunday ('Ħadd il-Palm')
Good Friday ('Il-Ġimgħa l-Kbira')
Easter ('L-Għid' or 'L-Irxoxt')

May

May by the Maltese is known as 'ix-xahar tal-ħsad u tal-Madonna ta' Pompej' ('the month of harvest and Our Lady of Pompeii')

1 May: Saint Joseph the Worker (www.sanguzepphaddiem.com  'San Ġużepp Ħaddiem' or 'Jum il-Ħaddiem') with a feast in Ħamrun and Birkirkara
2 May: Our Lady of Liesse ('Il-Madonna ta' Liesse') in Valletta
3 May: Feast of the Cross ('Santu Kruċ') in Birkirkara; St. Augustine ('Santu Wistin') in Valletta
9 May: Liturgical Feast of Saint George Preca ('San Ġorġ Preca')
31 May: Holy Trinity ('Trinità Mqaddsa') in Marsa
22 May: Saint Rita ('Santa Rita') in Valletta
24 May: The Annunciation ('Il-Lunzjata') in Tarxien
24 May: Saint Paul ('San Pawl') in Munxar
24 May: Saint Joseph ('San Ġużepp') in Għaxaq
31 May: Saint Anthony of Padua ('Sant' Antnin ta' Padova') in Birkirkara
Second Sunday of May: Mother's Day ('Jum l-Omm')

June

June by the Maltese is known as 'ix-xahar tad-dris, tal-ħġejjeġ, tal-Imnarja, u tal-Qalb ta' Ġesù' ('the month of reaping, bonfires, Saint Peter and Saint Paul, and the Sacred Heart of Jesus')

First Sunday of June: Saint Joseph ('San Ġużepp') in Għaxaq
2 June: Our Lady of Fatima ('Il-Madonna ta' Fatima') in Pietà, Malta
9 June: Saint Jack 
21 June: Christ the Redeemer ('Kristu Redentur') in Senglea
14 June: Saint Philip ('San Filep') in Żebbuġ, Malta
14 June: Corpus Christi in Għasri; Sacred Heart of Jesus ('Il-Qalb ta' Ġesù') in Fontana, Gozo
21 June: Our Lady of Lily ('Il-Madonna tal-Ġilju') in Mqabba; Saint Catherine ('Santa Katarina') in Żejtun; Saint John the Baptist ('San Ġwann Battista') in Xewkija
22 June: Our Lady of Lourdes ('Il-Madonna ta' Lourdes') in Qrendi
Third Sunday of June: Father's Day ('Jum il-Missier')
29 June: Saint Nicholas ('San Nikola') in Siġġiewi;  Our Lady of Sacred Heart ('Il-Qalb Bla Tebgħa ta' Marija') in Burmarrad; Saint Peter and Saint Paul ('San Pietru u San Pawl: L-Imnarja') in Mdina and Nadur
Fourth/Last Sunday of June: Saint John ('San Ġwann'); Saint George ('San Ġorġ') in Qormi

July

July by the Maltese is known as 'ix-xahar tal-Karmnu' ('Our Lady of Mount Carmel's month').

First Sunday of the month: Sacro Cuor ('Our Lady of the Sacred Heart') in Sliema
5 July: The Visitation ('Il-Viżitazzjoni') in Għarb; Saint Paul ('San Pawl') in Rabat; Our Lady of Sacred Heart ('Sacro Cuor') in Sliema; Saint Andrew ('Sant' Andrija'): in Luqa; Our Lady of Lourdes ('Il-Madonna ta' Lourdes') in Qrendi; Our Lady of Mount Carmel in Fleur-de-Lys
12 July: Our Lady of Mount Carmel in Fgura
13 July: Our Lady of Mount Carmel in Gżira
16 July: Our Lady of Mount Carmel ('Il-Madonna tal-Karmnu') in Valletta
19 July: Our Lady of Mount Carmel in Mdina and Birkirkara
20 July: Our Lady of Sorrows ('Marija Sultana Tal-Martri') in San Pawl Il-Baħar
26 July: Our Lady of Mount Carmel in Balluta Bay (San Ġiljan); Saint Anne ('Sant' Anna') in Marsaskala
Second Sunday of July: Saint Joseph ('San Ġużepp') in Kirkop; the Annunciation ('Marija Annunzjata') in Balzan
Third Sunday of July: Saint George (San Gorg) in Victoria; Saint Sebastian ('San Bastjan') in Hal Qormi; Sacred Family ('Sagra Familja') in Bidnija
27 July: Saint Venera ('Santa Venera') in Santa Venera; Mount Carmel* ('Madonna Tal-Karmnu') in Żurrieq
Last Sunday of July: Christ the King ('Kristu Re') in Paola, Malta

August

August by the Maltese is known as 'ix-xahar tal-frott, ta' Santa Marija u ta' San Lawrenz' ('the month of fruit, Saint Mary and Saint Lawrence').

First Sunday of August: Saint Peter in Chains ('San Pietru fil-Ktajjen') in Birżebbuġa
10 August: Saint Lawrence ('San Lawrenz') in Birgu and San Lawrenz
11 August: Saint Gaetan ('San Gejtanu') in Ħamrun
15 August: The Seven Saint Marys ('Is-Seba' Santa Marijiet') in Għaxaq, Mqabba, Qrendi, Gudja, Mosta, Attard and Victoria 
16 August: Saint Roque ('Santu Rokku')
Nearest Sunday to 18 August: Saint Helen (Santa Elena): in Birkirkara: Feast celebrated on a Sunday morning
Third Sunday of August: Stella Maris (Our Lady Star of the Sea) in Sliema
29 August: The Martyrdom of Saint John the Baptist ('Il-Martirju ta' San Ġwann')
Last Sunday of August: Saint Dominic of Guzman ('San Duminku ta' Guzman') in Birgu
Last Sunday of August: Saint Julian ('San Ġiljan') in San Ġiljan

September

September by the Maltese is known as 'ix-xahar tal-Vitorja, tal-Bambina, u tal-Grazzja' ('the month of Victory, the Nativity of Our Lady, and Our Lady of Graces').

8 September: The Nativity of Our Lady (Il-Bambina) in Mellieħa, Naxxar, Senglea and Xagħra
First Sunday after 8 September: Our Lady of Graces ('Il-Madonna tal-Grazzja')
12 September: The Name of Mary ('L-Isem ta' Marija')
21 September: Independence Day ('Jum L-Indipendenza')

October

October by the Maltese is known as 'ix-xahar tar-Rużarju' ('the month of the Rosary').

Our Lady of the Rosary ('Il-Madonna tar-Rużarju') different villages in Malta and Gozo celebrate Our Lady of Rosary on different days in October

November

By the Maltese, November is known as 'ix-xahar tal-inżigħ tal-weraq, tal-erwieħ, u tal-imwiet' ('the month of fallen leaves, of souls, and of deaths').

2 November: All Souls Day ('L-Għid tal-Erwieħ')
11 November: Saint Martin of Tours ('San Martin')
22 November: Saint Cecilia ('Santa Ċeċilja')
25 November: Saint Catherine of Alexandria ('Santa Katarina ta' Lixandra')
First Sunday after 25 November: Christ the King ('Kristu Re')

December

December, by the Maltese is known as 'ix-xahar tal-Milied u tal-Kunċizzjoni' ('the month of Christmas and the Conception')
8 December: Immaculate Conception in Cospicua
13 December: Republic Day ('Jum ir-Repubblika'); Saint Lucy ('Santa Luċija') in Mtarfa
25 December: Christmas ('Il-Milied'), with its traditional procession with the statue of Infant Jesus
26 December: Saint Stephen ('San Stiefnu')
28 December: Innocent Saints ('L-Innoċenti Martri')
31 December: Saint Silvester ('San Silvestru')

Distinction between National and Public Holidays

Article 3 of the National Holidays and Other Public Holidays Act (chapter 252) provides the distinction between National and Public Holidays.

The National Holidays shall be public holidays and on those occasions there shall be flown on public buildings the National Flag of Malta.

References

 
Malta